Lady Taylor was launched at Yarmouth in 1781 as Crown; she was renamed Lady Taylor the next year, and sailed as a West Indiaman. Between April 1793 and September 1794 she served as a hired armed sloop for the Royal Navy, during which time she convoyed merchant ships and captured one Dutch merchant ship. She returned to the West Indies trade and was wrecked in August 1796.

Career
Lady Taylor first appeared in Lloyd's Register (LR) in 1782.

Hired armed ship: The Royal Navy hired Lady Taylor on a contract that lasted from 27 April 1793, to 11 September 1794. Commander Richard Rutherford commissioned Lady Taylor in 1793.

In March 1794, Lloyd's List reported that the armed ship Lady Taylor had brought into Dover the heavily laden merchantman Jonge Pieter.

Fate
In August 1796 Lady Taylor, Walstrew, master, was wrecked on the Goodwin Sands. She was on a voyage from Jamaica to London.

Citations

References
 

1781 ships
Age of Sail merchant ships of England
Hired armed vessels of the Royal Navy
Maritime incidents in 1796